Wallyson Teixeira Mallmann (born 16 February 1994) is a Brazilian midfielder who plays for Portuguese club Marinhense.

Club career
Mallmann has played in the youth academies of FC Basel and Manchester City before joining Sporting B on loan. He made his debut for the club in a 4–0 home win against GD Chaves coming as a 78th-minute substitute for Luka Stojanović. He scored his first goal for the club in a 4–1 away loss against Farense. It was also reported that Barcelona were after signing Mallmann. Following the suspension of Adrien Silva, he was included in Sporting CP's squad against Benfica on 28 February 2014.

On 12 August 2015, Mallmann was loaned to Ligue 1 side OGC Nice.

On 31 August 2016, Mallmann joined Belgian club Standard Liège on a season-long loan deal.

On 31 January 2017, Standard Liège then decided to end his loan period. On the same day, Portuguese club Moreirense then reached an agreement with Sporting for the transfer of the player Mallmann.

References

External links

1994 births
Living people
Sportspeople from Mato Grosso do Sul
Association football midfielders
Brazilian footballers
Brazilian expatriate footballers
Sporting CP B players
Manchester City F.C. players
Sporting CP footballers
OGC Nice players
Standard Liège players
Moreirense F.C. players
Vitória F.C. players
G.D. Estoril Praia players
Leixões S.C. players
A.C. Marinhense players
Primeira Liga players
Liga Portugal 2 players
Campeonato de Portugal (league) players
Ligue 1 players
Championnat National 2 players
Belgian Pro League players
Brazilian expatriate sportspeople in Portugal
Brazilian expatriate sportspeople in England
Brazilian expatriate sportspeople in France
Brazilian expatriate sportspeople in Belgium
Expatriate footballers in Portugal
Expatriate footballers in England
Expatriate footballers in France
Expatriate footballers in Belgium